Audea kathrina is a moth of the family Erebidae. It is found in the Democratic Republic of Congo, Ghana, Ivory Coast, Mali, Mauritania, Nigeria and Uganda.

References

Moths described in 2005
Audea
Moths of Africa